Mohamed Benkhemassa (born 28 June 1993) is an Algerian footballer who plays as a midfielder for MC Alger, he plays for the Algeria national football team.

Club career
Benkhemassa started his career with USM Alger. On 2 September 2019, he signed a three-year deal with Spanish Segunda División side Málaga CF.
In 2023, he joined MC Alger.

International career
In 2015, Benkhemassa was part of the Algeria under-23 national team at the 2015 U-23 Africa Cup of Nations in Senegal. where he participated in all matches and lead the National team to the Football at the 2016 Summer Olympics for the first time in 36 years, Benkhemassa was named in the squad for the 2016 Summer Olympics. Participate in two matches first as a substitute for Rachid Aït-Atmane, against Argentina and second against Portugal as a starter. On 7 June 2018, Benkhemassa made his international debut for Algeria In a friendly match against Portugal in 3–0 loss.

Career statistics

Club

Honours

Club
 USM Alger
 Algerian Ligue Professionnelle 1 (2): 2015-16, 2018–19
 Algerian Super Cup (1): 2016

International
Algeria U23
Africa U-23 Cup of Nations runner-up:2015

References

External links
 
 

Living people
1993 births
Algerian footballers
USM Alger players
Footballers from Algiers
Footballers from Oran
Algeria under-23 international footballers
2015 Africa U-23 Cup of Nations players
Footballers at the 2016 Summer Olympics
2019 Africa Cup of Nations players
Olympic footballers of Algeria
Association football midfielders
Algerian expatriate sportspeople in Spain
Málaga CF players
Segunda División players
Algeria international footballers
Algeria youth international footballers
21st-century Algerian people